Kalle Väisänen (born 28 January 2003) is a Finnish professional ice hockey left winger for HC TPS of the Finnish Liiga.

Playing career
Väisänen was drafted in the fourth round, 106th overall, by the New York Rangers in the 2021 NHL Entry Draft. He made his professional debut for HC TPS during the 2021–22 season.

International play

Koivunen represented Finland at the 2021 IIHF World U18 Championships where he recorded one assist in five games. He represented Finland at the 2022 World Junior Ice Hockey Championships and won a silver medal.

Career statistics

Regular season and playoffs

International

References

External links
 

2003 births
Living people
Finnish ice hockey players
HC TPS players
New York Rangers draft picks
People from Kotka
Sportspeople from Kymenlaakso